is a mountain in Jōshin'etsu-kōgen National Park with an elevation of , located near Ueda and Suzaka in Nagano Prefecture, Japan. It is one of the  because of the flowers of Parnassia palustris which bloom in September. Along with Mount Azumaya, Mount Neko is one of the  published by The Shinano Mainichi Shimbun. The mountain should not be confused with a similarly named Mount Neko (根子岳) in Kumamoto Prefecture.

Mount Neko forms the western peak along the rim of the  caldera. This volcano was active 900,000–300,000 years ago. Mount Azumaya is one of the 100 Famous Japanese Mountains.

Mountain Climbing 
 Ascent
 One of the most frequently used trails begins at Sugadaira Farm. From there, it is approximately 30 minutes to a birch forest, then one hour through the forest, and another 30 minutes from the tree line to the summit.　
 Descent
 From the summit, it is approximately 75 minutes to the trailhead.

The trail is well-maintained and well-signed, there are no chains or ladders on the trail, and little technical skill is required. According to the "Nagano Trail Guide by Grade", it is one of the easiest mountains in Nagano Prefecture to climb. There is a public toilet beside the trailhead, and across the road is a small shop, selling ice cream from Sugadaira Farm.

Especially in winter, the summit provides a 360° panoramic view of the Northern Alps; from here, 30 of Japan's 100 Famous Mountains are visible, including Mount Azumaya, Mount Asama, Mount Fuji, Mount Aka, Mount Kita, Mount Hotakadake, Mount Jōnen, Mount Yari, Mount Shirouma, Mount Takatsuma, and Mount Hiuchi.

Yonako Falls 
Both falls combine to form the Yonako River, a tributary of the Chikuma River, Japan's longest river. Yonako Falls is located in Yonako, Suzaka City, and is listed as one of "Japan’s Top 100 Waterfalls" according to the Japanese Ministry of the Environment.

Access 
 Car
 From the Ueda Interchange on the Jōshin-etsu Expressway, it is approximately  via Route 144 and then Route 406.
 From the Suzaka Interchange on the Jōshin-etsu Expressway, it is approximately  via Route 403 and then Route 406.
 Bus
This service takes approximately 1 hour and leaves several times a day from Ueda Station.

Gallery

See also
 List of volcanoes in Japan
 List of mountains in Japan
 Mount Azumaya

References 

Mountains of Nagano Prefecture